Tikait Rai Bahadur (1760–1808) was the Diwan of Awadh from 1791 - 1796 in the regime of Asaf-u-daula.
He belonged from the Hindu Kayastha community.

Famine of 1784-85

Nawab Asif-ud-daula along with his prime minister Mirza Hasan Raza Khan and deewan Raja Tikait Rai, established a charitable institution (Rifah-e-Aam) which provided relief to thousands. Asif-ud-daula distributed salaries to the people with finance minister Raja Jhau Lal and deewan Raja Tikait Rai .

Welfare construction

He also constructed many temples, mosques, bridges and dug tanks all over the state, which can still be seen. He also built imambaras to house alams. In Tehsil Bithur, Kanpur  there is a Baradari and a bathing quay built of red stone on the banks of Ganges known as Patthar ghat, built by Raja Tikait Rai.

Raja Tikait was also named the royal yajmān (patron) of Hanuman Garhi in Ayodhya as a result of his donations.

In memory

 Raja Tikait Rai Ka Talab  - This was built by the Nawabs. It is a pucca talab/tank with a separate bathing ghat for women.  It also has the Sitala Mata temple where an annual fair is organized.

Notes

 Repertoire On Wajid Ali Shah & Monuments of Avadh, Avadh Cultural Club, Lucknow, 1974

References

External links
 A city on the death row By Obaid Nasir, Lucknow
 Places of Interest around Kanpur, Bithoor, Patthar Ghat

History of Uttar Pradesh
People from Lucknow
Awadh
1808 deaths
1760 births